In the Whyte notation for describing steam locomotive wheel arrangement, a 2-8-6 is a locomotive with a two-wheel leading truck, eight driving wheels, and a six-wheel trailing truck.  All 2-8-6 locomotives constructed have been 2-8-6T tank locomotives of the Mason Bogie pattern.

Other equivalent classifications are:
UIC classification: 1D3 (also known as German classification and Italian classification)
French classification: 143
Turkish classification: 48
Swiss classification: 4/8

In the UIC classification as applied in Germany and Italy, a rigid-framed locomotive of this arrangement would be 1'D3', and the Mason bogie (1'D)'3'.

Four Mason Bogies of this type were built for the Denver, South Park and Pacific Railroad; #25 Alpine, #26 Rico, #27 Roaring Fork and #28 Denver.  They were narrow gauge locomotives of  gauge.
Two more went to the Denver, Utah and Pacific, #10 Middle Park and #19 Denver.  The DU&P sold one of the latter to the Burlington and Northwestern Railway, a narrow-gauge affiliate of the CB&Q operating in Iowa.

References

8,2-8-6